Imperialis may refer to:
 Fritillaria imperialis, a plant
 Caenorhabditis imperialis, a nematode